Mariazelle Goonetilleke is a Sri Lankan singer and musician.

Early years
Mariazelle Goonetilleke was born in Nugegoda located in Colombo, Sri Lanka. She began her music career at the age of seven. At the age of ten Mariazelle won the junior section of the Ceylon Observer All Island Talent Competition. This allowed her to join a pre-teen group of young musicians called the "Junior Rhythmiers", a popular Sri Lankan music group. The group became well known in the 1960s when they were featured on Radio Ceylon, the oldest radio station in South Asia. It "ruled the airwaves" during the 1950s and 1960s, so any exposure on Radio Ceylon was a huge boost to young artists on the island.

Kandy Lamissi
According to the Sunday Observer of Colombo winning the Ceylon Observer Talent Contest "gave her more courage to play with bands like the Emeralds and the Midnight Mist". Recording "Kandy Lamissi" in 1977 was thought to be the turning point in her career. The song was an instant hit and Mariazelle came to be known by that name.

The success of "Kandy Lamissi" allowed her to perform not only in Sri Lanka but also in top hotels like Soaltee Oberoi in Kathmandu, Nepal. In the same year, she met with an accident in Nuwara Eliya and sustained serious injuries to her spine and collar bone. Helped by a classmate at the time, Christine Nadarajah, she claimed that her belief in God and community prayers saw her out from that dark period. After being released from hospital, Mariazelle had the privilege of being helped by Sri Lankan legends like: Clarence Wijewardene, the Emperor of Baila, M. S. Fernando, Stanley Peiris, Ajantha Ranasinghe, Chandral Fonseka and Sunil/Piyal of the Gypsies. The compositions of Clarence and others allowed her to perform with a different style and their songs attracted music lovers. Ajantha's composition "Sihina Nelum Mal" was dedicated to her son, Teshan now studying in England.

Music Genre
Mariazelle has performed songs in a wide range of musical genres from western pop music to Sri Lankan Baila. She is now well known as a leading Baila singer, performing her massive hit "Kandy Lamissi", all over the world. American Fulbright Scholar, Vasana Kelum de Mel, from the University of California, Los Angeles (UCLA) said, "Since I feel it is an essential issue to study the 'gender Baila' as well, the work of the female Baila singers like Mariazelle Goonetilleke and Corinne Almeida should also be appreciated."

She has also collaborated with some of Sri Lanka's top musicians, among them: Sunil Perera of the Gypsies, M.S. Fernando, Dalreen Suby, Ronnie Leitch, Clarence Wijewardena, Annesley Malewana, Damian Wickramatilleke, Maxi Rozairo, Shanelle Fernando, Umara Sinhawansa, Ashanthi De Alwis and Raj Seneviratne.

Mariazelle spoke about her own struggles, and her rise to fame, in 2003 in an interview with the Sri Lankan Sunday Observer: "To have remained as I am in the music scene for 35 years, retaining and who and what I am is a most difficult thing. It's a feeling of elation because of the struggles I have faced to come out on top."

The Island newspaper in Colombo noted that, "Kandy Lamissi" hitmaker Mariazelle Goonetilleke, is another local artiste who is very much in demand with Sri Lankans, domiciled abroad. She is regularly seen in Melbourne, London, the Middle East, Canada and most foreign cities where Sri Lankan Associations exist. Her popularity abroad could be attributed to her versatility, she could handle most songs with ease – be it Sinhala, English, Hindi or Tamil.Mariazelle also has the ability to communicate with her audience in a friendly manner. And most people like her style.

Christian faith
Mariazelle became a committed Christian in 2009. According to The Island newspaper:"Mariazelle is very much into religion and has taken God as her friend and saviour." She joined the People's Church in Colombo. Mariazelle said: "I have sung all my life but now there is singing in my heart. The greatest song I sing is with God as my audience."

See also
Baila
Music of Sri Lanka
Radio Ceylon
List of Sri Lankan musicians

References

External links
Sri Lankan superstar Mariazelle Goonetilleke's massive hit 'Kandy Lamissi' – YouTube
Kandi Lamissi – Australian version on YouTube
M S Fernando & Mariazelle Goonetilleke "Nelum male Pethikadala" on YouTube
Mariazelle Goonetilleke sings her hit 'Mallika' on Sri Lankan Television -SAMAYAE MUWADORA PRESENTS BY SIRASA TV – on YouTube
Mariazelle Goonetilleke sings 'Feeling Hot, Hot, Hot' at a Banquet at the BMICH in Colombo – on YouTube
Sinhala Baila Karaoke – Mariazelle with Sunflower – on YouTube
Mariazelle Goonetilleke with the group Zenith on Rupavahini Television, Colombo singing 'Ranamonarai ranagiravei & Oba labaganna'
Song I like to sing – Mariazelle with Take 5 at a Concert in Colombo
Mariazelle Goonetilleke with Bhathiya & Santhush – 'La nil Ahasata Lanwee' hit song on YouTube
Mariazelle Goonetilleke sings 'Sri Lanka.'
My Life Changing Moment & Testimony English 16 08 09 – Mariazelle Goonetilleke shares her faith and sings 'Just A Closer Walk with Thee,' backed by members of 'Junior Rhythmiers' at the People's Church AOG in Colombo, Sri Lanka
"Kandy Lamissi" Mariazelle, Sunday Observer, Colombo
Performers hoodwink public with technology – Mariazelle, Daily News, Colombo

Living people
People from Colombo
Sri Lankan Christians
Sinhalese singers
20th-century Sri Lankan women singers
21st-century Sri Lankan women singers
Year of birth missing (living people)